The Missouri Valley Conference men's soccer tournament is the conference championship tournament in soccer for the Missouri Valley Conference (MVC).  The tournament has been held every year since the MVC began men's soccer competition in 1991. It is a single-elimination tournament and seeding is based on regular season conference records. The winner, declared conference champion, receives the conference's automatic bid to the NCAA Division I men's soccer championship.


List of champions 
Sources = 

‡ = The 2000 Championship game was the longest game in MVC Tournament history, with the winning goal being scored at 140:48.

† = The 2001 Championship game was the second longest match in MVC Tournament history, with the winning goal scored at 139:54

By school

BF = Current active members
 * = Former Member or Affiliate.
 # = MVC member, no longer plays soccer.

References

External links
 

Missouri Valley Conference
Missouri Valley Conference men's soccer

NCAA Division I men's soccer conference tournaments
1991 establishments in Oklahoma
Recurring sporting events established in 1991